Sajasan  is a South Korean mountain that sits between the counties of Pyeongchang, Yeongwol and Hoengseong, in Gangwon-do.

See also
 List of mountains in Korea

Notes

References
 

Mountains of South Korea
Mountains of Gangwon Province, South Korea
One-thousanders of South Korea